Toronto Rock 'n' Roll Revival 1969, Volume IV is a live album of the Alice Cooper Band. Due to the fact that the recording is owned by a private party, it is unauthorized but not a bootleg. It features Alice Cooper's infamous chicken-throwing performance at the Toronto Rock and Roll Revival festival at Varsity Stadium in Toronto on September 13, 1969, and showcases the early psychedelic music style of Cooper and his band in support of their first album release, Pretties for You.

Although the album was originally released on vinyl in 1982, it has been re-released many times over the years on vinyl, cassette, CD, and digital download by various record labels under different titles, using alternative track titles and track orders. Many of these re-releases additionally include two 1964 studio tracks by Ronnie Hawkins, falsely credited on the album to Alice Cooper.

In 1996, Brian Nelson, Alice Cooper's personal assistant, said concerning this releases: "The rights to the recording were sold by Alice's management at the time of the recording to a third party. That party has licensed out the rights to the recording many times to various companies. Alice Cooper do not make a penny from it. My theory is that the two non-Alice songs somehow wound up on the original master tape. The distributors not knowing and not particularly caring, put the album out of the tape as is. When the album was pressed again later by other companies, they didn't bother to check if all the songs were Alice or not. They would have no particular reason to."

In 2012, the label Applebush released another version of this concert with the title Nobody Likes Us under the moniker of The Alice Cooper Group. This is the first known CD release to feature the whole concert speed corrected, correct song titles, and chronological track listing. Guitarist Michael Bruce advised how to name and to arrange the titles correctly. The sound quality is also better than on all of the other releases. As a bonus it also contains recordings of a concert at the Avalon Ballroom in San Francisco on March 30, 1969, but the sound quality of that show is poor.

Track listing

Track listing of completely correct release Nobody Likes Us

Track listing of first release Toronto Rock 'n' Roll Revival 1969, Volume IV

Alternate releases 
Since the first release in 1982 this Toronto festival show has been released many times from many different labels with many different cover artworks and track listings. Noteworthy is that the track listing differs very often. Most editions have eight tracks as the original release. Some editions have seven tracks. These ones merged the "Group Instrumental" and "I've Written Home to Mother". A few releases since 2000 consist of nine tracks. These releases added a medley of four songs: "Ain't That Just Like a Woman", "Goin' to the River", "Nobody Likes Me (Live)" and "Science Fiction (Live)". But this medley doesn't include any new material. It just contains parts of these four songs you can already find on this release, which were simply put together. Worth mentioning is, that there is only one release except the completely correct Nobody Likes Us since 1982, which omitted the two Ronnie Hawkins songs: A 1985 cassette release via Golden Circle named Science Fiction.

Another interesting detail is, that some releases mention strange songwriters for all the Alice Cooper compositions (not the Ronnie Hawkins ones). Probably this happened because of all the wrong song titles.

Releases on sound recordings 
The following list with many different releases is not intended to be exhaustive. It should just be an overview.

Digital only releases 
Noteworthy is, that Live At Toronto Rock 'N' Roll Revival 1969 from 2018 is the only one digital release to date which omits the Ronnie Hawkins tracks and partly uses the correct song titles. "An Instrumental" and "I've Written Home to Mother" weren't renamed, but it is mentioned that these songs are parts of "Lay Down and Die, Goodbye".

References 

Alice Cooper live albums
Bootleg recordings
1991 live albums
1991 compilation albums